Karanganyar may refer to:

 Karanganyar Regency, a regency of Central Java, Indonesia
 Karanganyar, Karanganyar, town, district and the capital of Karanganyar Regency, Indonesia
 Karanganyar, Kebumen, town and district in Kebumen Regency, Indonesia
 Karanganyar, Demak, town and district in Demak Regency, Indonesia
 Karanganyar, Ngawi, town and district in Ngawi Regency, Indonesia
 Karanganyar, Pekalongan, town and district in Pekalongan Regency, Indonesia
 Karanganyar, Purbalingga, town and district in Purbalingga Regency, Indonesia
 Karang Anyar, Sawah Besar, the village of South Jakarta, Indonesia